Kiia may refer to:

 Kinomichi Instructors International Association, KIIA
 Kiia, Estonia, village in Estonia
 Kiia (singer) Canadian singer